Zargari (or Romāno) is a dialect of Balkan Romani, spoken in Zargar region (Abyek district) of the Qazvin Province of in Iran by the ethnic Zargari people. The language can be found in surrounding regions as well. It is one of the only Indo-Aryan languages still spoken in Iran, and is considered endangered. Zargari takes its name from the Persian word for "goldsmith" ( zargar).

Vocabulary 

 Eighteen= Oxdu
 for me= Miri
 for you= Diri
 Fish= mačo
 God=del
 horse=grast
 Fox= Jӕqqӕlis
 hand= vast
 Water= pani
 Night= Rati

See also
 Domari language
 Romani language

References

External links
Hassan Rezai Baghbidi. The Zargari Language: An Endangered European Romani in Iran
Marushiakova, Elena and Vesselin Popov. 2010. Migrations West to East in the Times of the Ottoman Empire: The Example of a Gypsy/Roma Group in Modern Iran. Anthropology of the Middle East 5 (1): p. 93–99.

European diaspora in Asia
Languages of Iran
Romani in Iran
Endangered languages
Dialects of Romani